Cerastis fishii is a moth of the family Noctuidae. It is found in eastern North America from Newfoundland to southern Ontario in Canada. In the United States, it is found from western Maine to Ohio, Michigan, and northern Wisconsin, then south to North Carolina. It has also been recorded from Tennessee.

The wingspan is 30–36 mm. Adults are on wing from March to June.

The larvae feed on the flowers and leaves of blueberry.

External links
Bug Guide
The Noctuinae (Lepidoptera: Noctuidae) of Great Smoky Mountains National Park, U.S.A.

Noctuinae
Moths of North America